John W. Tramburg (February 28, 1913 – January 14, 1963) was an American administrator who served as the Commissioner of the Social Security Administration from 1953 to 1954.

Tramburg was born in Fall River, Wisconsin. He died of a heart attack on January 14, 1963, in Trenton, New Jersey at age 49.

References

1913 births
1963 deaths
Commissioners of the Social Security Administration
People from Fall River, Wisconsin